Link Aviation Devices was a manufacturer of aircraft simulators. The company is most notable for inventing the Link Trainer, and is credited with starting the flight simulator industry. It is currently a subsidiary of CAE Incorporated.

History 
Ed Link founded the company in 1929 in Binghamton, New York, after experimenting with the compressed air used in the products of his father's Link Piano and Organ Company. The company's Link Trainer saw widespread service as an aircraft simulator during and after World War II. As a result, Link Aviation became one of the leading manufacturers of aircraft simulators in the world.

In 1954, Link Aviation was purchased by the General Precision Equipment Corporation. It, in turn, was purchased by Singer Corporation in 1968 and Link became the Simulation Products Division and later the Link Flight Simulation Division. The reincorporated Link Military Simulation Corporation was sold in 1988 to CAE Industries, which became CAE-Link. CAE-Link was purchased by Hughes Electronics Corporation in 1995. After only three years, it was bought by Raytheon. Then, in 2000, it was acquired by L-3 Communications and named L-3 Link Simulation & Training. Finally, 26 years after it was sold by the company, it was repurchased by CAE in 2021.

Products

Trainers 
 AVCATT
 Link Trainer
 School Trainer – Light airplane trainer. Intended for use in elementary school through college.
 C-11B – Used for training for the Lockheed F-80 Shooting Star.
 GAT-1 – General aviation trainer.
 GAT-2 – Light twin engine procedural trainer. Flying characteristics resemble the Beechcraft Baron, Cessna 310, and Piper Aztec.
 GAT-3 – Twin jet trainer
 Model 60 – Private and business airplane trainer.
 MB-5 – Flight simulator for the F-102A
 MB-42 – Flight simulator for the F-106A
 ME-1 – Basic jet instrument flight trainer. Developed from the T-37 cockpit.
 P-1 – Constructed from a T-6G cockpit and mounted on a modified C-8 base. A slightly modified version was known as the 1-CA-2 by the U.S. Navy.
 T-4 – Instrument flight trainer for the T-37.
 T-7 – Instrument flight trainer for the T-38.

Other 
 A-12 sextant

References

External links 
 Link Training & Simulation
 Life After Link

Aerospace companies of the United States
Companies based in Binghamton, New York